Stewartville is a census-designated place and unincorporated community in Coosa County, Alabama, United States. Its population was 1,662 as of the 2020 census.

Demographics

2020 census

As of the 2020 United States census, there were 1,662 people, 605 households, and 449 families residing in the CDP.

References

Census-designated places in Coosa County, Alabama
Census-designated places in Alabama